Thomas Joseph Polanic (April 2, 1943 – September 22, 2019) was a Canadian professional ice hockey player who played 19 games in the National Hockey League for the Minnesota North Stars during the 1969–70 and 1970–71 seasons. The rest of his career, which lasted from 1965 to 1977, was spent in various minor leagues.

Career statistics

Regular season and playoffs

Awards and honors

References

External links
 

1943 births
2019 deaths
AHCA Division I men's ice hockey All-Americans
Canadian ice hockey defencemen
Charlotte Checkers (EHL) players
Cleveland Barons (1937–1973) players
Iowa Stars (CHL) players
Michigan Wolverines men's ice hockey players
Minnesota North Stars players
NCAA men's ice hockey national champions
Ontario Hockey Association Senior A League (1890–1979) players
Phoenix Roadrunners (WHL) players
St. Michael's Buzzers players
Ice hockey people from Toronto
Toronto St. Michael's Majors players
Tulsa Oilers (1964–1984) players
Victoria Maple Leafs players